The Yellow River Cantata is a cantata by Chinese composer Xian Xinghai (1905–1945). Composed in Yan'an in early 1939 during the Second Sino-Japanese War, the work was inspired by a patriotic poem by Guang Weiran, which was also adapted as the lyrics. Premiered on April 13 of the same year in the Shanbei Gongxue Hall of Yan'an, the work soon spread to all parts of China.

Historical background
According to official accounts by the Chinese Communist Party, after the Chinese city of Wuhan fell to Japanese invaders in November 1938 during the Second Sino-Japanese War, the poet Guang Weiran led the 3rd Squad of the Anti-Enemy Troupe across the Yellow River near the Hukou Waterfall and eastwards into the communist anti-Japanese headquarters in the Lüliang Mountains. During his journey, he witnessed the local boatmen battle against heavy gales and torrential waves, and heard their spirit-lifting songs.

Upon reaching Yan'an in January 1939, Guang wrote a patriotic poem entitled Yellow River and recited it during the Chinese New Year celebration. The poem spoke of the oppression of Chinese people under the invaders and called for all to take up arms to defend China. Xian Xinghai, who received his education at the Conservatoire de Paris and returned to China in 1935, was also present at the recital. He went on to write a cantata based on the poem.

According to an account by Xian's daughter, he began work on the composition on March 26, and took merely four days to complete all eight movements. However, he was not satisfied with the Second and Sixth, which he took two more days to amend. Two weeks later, the cantata premiered in the Shanbei Gongxue Hall in Yan'an, performed by a forty-strong choir and a primitive orchestra conducted by Wu Xiling. It soon spread to many parts of China to inspire its listeners to participate in the war efforts against Imperial Japan.

Musical influence
The Yellow River Cantata laid the ground for Chinese contemporary large-scaled vocal music composition. In the late 1960s, it was adapted into a piano concerto entitled the Yellow River Piano Concerto by the pianist Yin Chengzong. This arrangement, together with the violin concerto Liang Zhu by He Zhanhao and Chen Gang, are the two best internationally known musical works that combined source materials that are purely Chinese with Western music methodology.

Versions
There are altogether four different versions of the Yellow River Cantata that had been performed in public. The first was the initial composition by Xian Xinghai while in Yan'an. Accommodations were made for the lack of musical instruments at that time, as the orchestra consisted of only the violin, Chinese flute, harmonica, sanxian, erhu and dahu, along with a few percussion instruments.

A year after Xian departed for the Soviet Union in 1940, he amended his composition for performance by a fully equipped Western orchestra, aided by a few Chinese ethnic instruments. He also made some amendments to the choral arrangement. In addition, a prologue was added, increasing the number of movements to nine.

The third and fourth revisions were respectively made by Xian's students, Li Huanzhi and Yan Liangkun. Li simplified the "Soviet" version for performance by the Shanghai Symphony Orchestra, while Yan incorporated the prologue into the first movement to return the cantata to its initial arrangement of eight movements (with the first as the overture) for performance by the Central Orchestra during the 1980s. Yan also made heavy amendments to the Third Movement, Water of the Yellow River comes from Heaven, such that the new melody was vastly different from the original. This last revision became the most played and heard version today.

Current arrangement 
The current arrangement of the Yellow River Cantata contains eight movements. However, most performances only use seven, omitting the third. The cantata is meant to be performed by a full western orchestra with some Chinese instruments, and a full SATB choir. Soloists include a bass in the second movement, a tenor and baritone in the fifth, and a soprano in the sixth. There is also a male speaker, who recites various political exhortations at the beginning of each movement.

The arrangement from the original is as follows:

 Song of the Yellow River Boatmen
 Ode to the Yellow River
 The Yellow River Water from the Sky (Usually omitted from current versions)
 Ballad of the Yellow River
 Singing by the River Side
 Lament of the Yellow River
 Defend the Yellow River
 The Roaring Yellow River
A overture section was added in 1941 when Xian Xinghai visited the Soviet Union.

Trivia
 According to an account by Xian Xinghai's daughter, Guang Weiran knew Xian was Cantonese and had a sweet tooth. Guang then asked someone to buy a kilogram of sugar, a scarcity during wartime, and gave it to Xian, who ate it for snacks while composing the cantata.
 Due to the lack of musical instruments, the orchestra for the premiere of the Yellow River Cantata consisted of only two or three violins and twenty-odd Chinese ethnic musical instruments. The rest were products of innovation: diesel barrels for bass strings and washbasins for percussion.
 Mao Zedong, who was then Chairman of the Central Military Commission of the Chinese Communist Party leading the anti-Japanese resistance in Yan'an, was also present during the premiere.

See also
Production Cantata
 Yellow River Piano Concerto, piano concerto adaptation of the Yellow River Cantata by Yin Chengzong.

References

Chinese patriotic songs
Songs about rivers
Cantatas
1939 compositions
1939 in music